"" (Italian for "There we will give each other our hands") is a duet for the characters Don Giovanni (baritone) and Zerlina (soprano) in Mozart's 1787 opera Don Giovanni (act 1, scene 9).

Text
The duet, with words by Lorenzo Da Ponte, is sung during the first act of the opera. Don Giovanni has just met Zerlina and her betrothed, Masetto. In an attempt to distract Masetto and have him removed from the scene, Giovanni offers to host a wedding celebration for the couple at his castle. When Masetto has left, Giovanni attempts to seduce Zerlina to accompany him to his castle. However, after the end of the duet Donna Elvira arrives and thwarts the seduction, and leaves with Zerlina.

Music

"Là ci darem la mano", number 7 in the score, starts in the key of A major with a tempo indication of andante and a time signature of 2/4. The vocal range for Don Giovanni covers E3 to E4, Zerlina's range covers E4 to F5. The piece is labelled a "duettino", a "little duet". This may be because the two roles sing only as a duet towards the very end of the piece, after Zerlina's assenting Andiam!. Until then, Giovanni tries to seduce Zerlina, but she is torn between Giovanni's exhortations and her fidelity to Masetto. Finally, the signal for her submission is a swerving chromatic melodic line, falling over almost an octave during 3 1/2 bars. After a fermata emphasising Zerlina's weakening resolve, the tempo then changes to allegro and the time signature to 6/8. A proper two-part duet, much of it in third parallels, is then sung for most of the remaining 32 bars. A performance takes between 3 and  minutes.

Literary reference 
In the Calypso episode of the novel Ulysses by James Joyce, Molly tells her husband Leopold Bloom that she will be singing this duet on her upcoming concert tour organised by Blazes Boylan. Molly is about to commence an affair with Boylan later that day, so this may be an unconscious hint of her intentions.

In chapter XIV of Aldous Huxley's Antic Hay, Theodore Gumbril hums the opening of this aria and imagines his dining partner, Mrs Myra Viveash, as Zerlina, a part she is happy to play, although subconsciously he is thinking of Emily, another married woman with whom he'd rather be dining.

Influence
The duet has been the basis of several other works, including:
 Bartolomeo Campagnoli, Air varié, Op. 7, No. 2
 August Eberhard Müller Sonata Op. 7, No. 1, second movement, Andante con variazioni
 Variations on "Là ci darem la mano" for two oboes and English horn, WoO 28 (1796) by Ludwig van Beethoven
 Fantasy on "Là ci darem la mano" for clarinet and orchestra by Franz Danzi (1763–1826)
 August Alexander Klengel, Fuga Nr. 19 A major in 48 Canons and Fugues, Vol. 1
 Francesco Antonio Calegari (c. 1798 — c. 1850), Variazioni sopra "Là ci darem la mano", Op. 18
 Friedrich Kalkbrenner, Fantasie sur "Là ci darem la mano", Op. 33
 Variations for guitar on "Là ci darem la mano" (1828) by Hector Berlioz (lost)
 Nicolas-Charles Bochsa: Air varié sur "Là ci darem la mano", Op. 73, No. 2  (harp)
 Variations on "Là ci darem la mano", Op. 2 (1827) for piano and orchestra, by Frédéric Chopin
 Réminiscences de Don Juan, S. 418 for solo piano, by Franz Liszt
 Sigismond Thalberg, Fantasie et variations sur 2 motifs de Don Juan, Op. 14

References

External links

, Bryn Terfel, Hong Hei-kyung, Metropolitan Opera, 2001
, Frank Sinatra, Kathryn Grayson, from It Happened in Brooklyn (1947)
 Digital realisations of most compositions based on "Là ci darem la mano"

Compositions by Wolfgang Amadeus Mozart
1787 compositions
Don Giovanni
Opera excerpts
Male–female vocal duets
Compositions in A major